Parliamentary elections were held in Madagascar on 28 August 1983, having originally been scheduled for 1982, but delayed by the presidential election and the "economic difficulties facing the country". Only parties affiliated with the AREMA-dominated National Front for the Defense of the Revolution were allowed to compete in the election. AREMA was the only party to field candidates in all 137 constituencies, and won 117 of them with over 65% of the vote.

Voter turnout was 72.75% .

Results

References

Elections in Madagascar
1983 in Madagascar
Madagascar
August 1983 events in Africa